Hugo Miranda (born 8 August 1980) is a former footballer defender from Paraguay who last played for Finnish club FF Jaro in the Veikkausliiga.

Career
Miranda started his career in 2002 with Sport Colombia in the Paraguayan Primera División. In 2005, he transferred to MyPa of Finland.

1980 births
Living people
Paraguayan footballers
Paraguayan expatriate footballers
Sport Colombia footballers
Cerro Porteño players
Club Olimpia footballers
Myllykosken Pallo −47 players
FF Jaro players
FC Lahti players
Veikkausliiga players
Expatriate footballers in Peru
Expatriate footballers in Finland
Association football defenders